Terence Howard (born 1937) is an  English former footballer who played in the 1960 Summer Olympics.

Terence Howard may also refer to:

Terrence Howard (born 1969), American actor and singer
Terence Trent Howard or Terence Trent D'Arby (born 1962), American singer
Terry Howard (born 1966), English former footballer